Lago di Bilancino is an artificial lake near Barberino di Mugello in the Metropolitan City of Florence, Tuscany, Italy, made with a dam on the river Sieve. At an elevation of 252 m, the lake surface area is approximately 5 km².

Lakes of Tuscany
Barberino di Mugello